Amjad Bobby (Punjabi, ; 1942  15 April 2005) was an acclaimed Pakistani music composer and director.

Early life and career
He was born in Amritsar, British India in 1942. His father wanted him to be a clerk but he preferred to become a film music composer. His first film as a music director was Aik Nagina (1969) and the song "Dil nahi toe koi sheesha koi pathar hi milay" in Ahmed Rushdi's voice gained him some recognition.

"Initially, like all musicians, he achieved fame after struggling and assisted renowned musicians like A. Hameed, Nashad, Nisar Bazmi, Khwaja Khurshid Anwar and Rasheed Attre."  Amjad Bobby had little success in the decade of the 1970s. His first hit song was "Kajra lagana chor do, sawan ka rukh badal jaye ga", sung by great singer Mehdi Hassan for movie Ansoo Aur Sholay. Later he composed music of movie Aik Nagina with two super hit songs "Beena tera naam" and "Tere bin raha jaye naa".
The decade of the 1980s brought luck for Amjad Bobby and he gave many great film songs to the Pakistani film industry. His success continued till his death in 2005.

Death
Amjad Bobby died of cardiac arrest on 15 April 2005 in Lahore. His death was a big loss for Pakistani film music industry because Amjad Bobby was a composer who almost singlehandedly gave film music a new direction and brought much freshness into the film music in the 1990s, when it most needed it in Pakistan.

Awards and recognition
 Nigar Award for Best Music Director in film 'Kabhi Alwida Na Kehna' (1983)
 Nigar Award for film Ghunghat (1996)
 Nigar Award for film Deewane Tere Pyar Ke (1997)
 Nigar Award for film Yeh Dil Aap Ka Huwa (2002)
 He also received the 'Bolan Award' for best Music Composer for film Mujhe Jeene Do (1999).

Worked with many film playback singers
He had worked with singers from both Pakistan and India. He composed music for Ahmed Rushdi, Salma Agha, Akhlaq Ahmed, Ghulam Abbas, A Nayyar, Waris Baig, Shazia Manzoor, Humera Channa, Arshad Mehmood, Kumar Sanu, Udit Narayan, Alka Yagnik, Sonu Nigam, Kavita, Saira Nasim, Jaspinder Narula.

Special appearances as a live singer
At the Nigar Awards presentation, he sang a song from his movie 'Kabhi Haan Kabhi Naa'. The song was originally sung by Arshad Mehmood, but due to his busy schedule, he could not come so Amjad Bobby sang in his place. He also sang in Javed Sheikh's movie Mushkil, and performed this song on stage several times.

Filmography as music composer

Film songs

See also
Javed Sheikh, directed "Mushkil", its music was composed by Amjad Bobby
Kabhi Pyar Na Karna, (2008) film, Amjad Bobby is the music composer

References

External links
 
Reviews
Review of "Yeh Dil Aap Ka Hua" on The Hot Spot online Archived music composed by Amjad Bobby

1942 births
2005 deaths
Punjabi people
Nigar Award winners
Pakistani composers
Pakistani film score composers
Pakistani musicians